Uncial 065 (in the Gregory-Aland numbering), ε 1 (Soden), is a Greek uncial manuscript of the New Testament, dated paleographically to the 6th century

Description 
The codex contains a small parts of the John 11:50-12:9, 15:12-16:2, 19:11-24, on 3 parchment leaves (29 cm by 23 cm). The text is written in two columns per page, 29 lines per page.

It is a palimpsest, the upper text contains a Georgian calendar. 

The Greek text of this codex is a representative of the Byzantine text-type. Kurt Aland placed it in Category V.

Currently the manuscript is dated by the INTF to the 6th century.

It was examined by Tischendorf, Kurt Treu, and Schmid.

It is currently housed at the Russian National Library (Suppl. Gr. 6, I) in Saint Petersburg.

See also 
 List of New Testament uncials
 Textual criticism

References

Further reading 

 Constantin von Tischendorf, Monumenta sacra et profana I, pp. XIII-XIX, 1-48.
 Kurt Treu, Die Griechischen Handschriften des Neuen Testaments in der UdSSR; eine systematische Auswertung des Texthandschriften in Leningrad, Moskau, Kiev, Odessa, Tbilisi und Erevan, T & U 91 (Berlin, 1966), pp. 18-19.
 U. B. Schmid, D. C. Parker, W. J. Elliott, The Gospel according to St. John: The majuscules (Brill 2007), pp. 52-58. [text of the codex in the Gospel of John]

Palimpsests
Greek New Testament uncials
6th-century biblical manuscripts
National Library of Russia collection